SOS Records is a California-based punk-rock record label. The label was founded by Rob Chaos of Total Chaos and Ezzat Soliman.

Bands

4 Past Midnight
Abrasive Wheels
The Adicts
Adolescents
The Agitators
Antidote
Bad Manners
Bang Sugar Bang
Blitz
Broken Bones
Conflict
DBD
The Diffs
Drongos for Europe
The Exploited
Final Conflict
Funeral Dress
GBH
The Ghouls
Goldblade
The Lurkers
Mike Blanx and the SDABS
Naked Aggression
Phantom Rockers
Red Alert
Resilience
Resistant Culture
Resist And Exist
Ryan Mudd and the Stuff
Sham 69
Sick56
Sick on the Bus
So Unloved
State of Revolution
Total Chaos
Toy Dolls
Varukers
The Vibrators
Vice Squad

External links
Official homepage

American record labels